Battista Lomellini (Genoa, 1460Genoa, 1540) was the 48th Doge of the Republic of Genoa.

Biography 
The strong skills of Lomellini led him to the appointment on 4 January 1533, the third in biennial succession and the forty-eighth in republican history. It was during his dogate that he still received, with great solemnity, Charles V in a meeting in Rivarolo with the entire Senate. In his two-year dogale, he re-established commercial relations with the Kingdom of France. When his mandate ended, on 4 January 1535, he received his last assignment as ambassador and speaker of the Republic for the meeting in 1537 with Pope Paul III at Savona.

Lomellini was married twice, his first wife was Caterina di Carlotto Lomellini, while in second marriage he married Luisina di Lodisio Doria, he had numerous children, including Gioffredo, Oberto and Battista.

See also 
 Republic of Genoa
 Doge of Genoa

References 

16th-century Doges of Genoa
1460 births
1540 deaths
Families of Genoa